Mark Schroeder is an American philosopher whose scholarship focuses on metaethics, particularly expressivism and other forms of noncognitivism. He is a professor of philosophy at the University of Southern California.

Publications

References

External links 
 
 

University of Southern California faculty
21st-century American philosophers
American ethicists
Year of birth missing (living people)
Living people